Daniela Benedini (born May 24, 1972, in Desio, Italy) is an Italian contemporary painter and decorator who is specialized in the use of the trompe-l'œil.

Artistic background

Daniela Benedini studied painting at Brera Academy of Milan, Italy where she graduated in 1994 with a study on The Trompe-l'œil in the History of Art.

For many years she has cooperated with some of the most prestigious Italian interior designers creating her artworks all over the world.

Works

She has been commissioned murals and decorations for several public buildings and private residences in Italy, Peru, Kazakhstan, Kuwait, Greece, etc.

These include the Basilica of Desio, the Public Hospital of Desio, the San Gerardo Hospital in Monza, the Bergamonti Square in Misinto (Italia) and the Cathedral of Chimbote (Peru).

 Velo Damascato, 2009, Basilica di Desio (Italia) 
 Favole in Ospedale, 1997, Ospedale di Monza (Italia)

Awards 

 Best Artwork at the International trompe-l'œil festival in 2005 
 Special Award "Ordine degli Architetti Pianificatori Paesaggistici e Conservatori della Provincia di Lodi" at the International trompe-l'œil festival in 2007

Notes

External links
- Daniela Benedini (official website)

1972 births
Living people
21st-century Italian women artists
People from Desio
Italian women painters
Brera Academy alumni
Trompe-l'œil artists